Pastis is an anise-flavoured spirit.

Pastis may also refer to:

Pastis & Buenri, a Spanish production duo and DJs
Stephan Pastis (born 1968), American cartoonist and former lawyer

See also
Pasti (disambiguation)
 Pasty (disambiguation)